Nancy was a sloop launched in 1803 and wrecked on 18 April 1805 near Jervis Bay, Australia.

Nancy was a sloop of some 20 tons constructed on the Hawkesbury River, New South Wales by Kable & Co. It arrived in Sydney on its maiden voyage on 17 October 1803. On 18 April 1805, Nancy commanded by Captain Demaria was just off Jervis Bay when a violent squall hit the area. Nancy's mainsail split and the ship could make no leeway. Everything on board was washed overboard and then the ship struck a small sandy beach between two headlands. The ship promptly broke up with one crew member, Richard Wall, from Exeter, drowning.  The remaining crew walked to Sydney, arriving on 1 May 1805.

Citations

Shipwrecks of the Shoalhaven Region
Ships built in New South Wales
History of New South Wales
1803 ships
Maritime incidents in 1805
1805 in Australia
1788–1850 ships of Australia
Coastal trading vessels of Australia
Sloops of Australia